The 1973–74 Midland Football League season was the 74th in the history of the Midland Football League, a football competition in England.

Clubs
The league featured 15 clubs which competed in the previous season, along with two new clubs:
Clifton All Whites
Ilkeston Town, relegated from the Southern Football League

League table

References

External links

Midland Football League (1889)
M